Motati is a community council located in the Leribe District of Lesotho. Its population in 2006 was 10,080.

Villages
The community of Motati includes the villages of Ha 'Mako, Ha 'Masamoele, Ha 'Meche, Ha 'Ntšekhe, Ha Kalaele (Matebeleng), Ha Khanyele, Ha Koebelane (Ha Makhoa), Ha Kotsana, Ha Lebona, Ha Lekhanya, Ha Likatana, Ha Maromaki, Ha Masena, Ha Monotsi, Ha Mosebo, Ha Mositi, Ha Motlatsi, Ha Ntoahae, Ha Ntsu, Ha Pontšo, Ha Porobele, Ha Qatsa (Ha Makhoa), Ha Ramotho, Ha Ramotinyane, Ha Rantsane, Ha Tabolane (Ha Makhoa), Ha Tente, Ha Thabo, Ha Tobolela, Ha Tšiu, Ha Tumahole, Jorotane, Letsatseng, Liphokong, Litšukulung, Mafikeng (Ha Makhoa), Makhalong, Moreneng (Ha Makhoa), Sekhokong and Tarabane.

References

External links
 Google map of community villages

Populated places in Leribe District